Isabela's 6th congressional district is one of the six congressional districts of the Philippines in the province of Isabela. It has been represented in the House of Representatives of the Philippines since 2019. The district consists of the city of Cauayan and the municipalities of Echague, San Guillermo, and San Isidro. It is currently represented in the 19th Congress by Faustino A. Dy V of Lakas–CMD, who has represented the district since its creation.

Representation history

See also 

 Legislative districts of Isabela

References 

Congressional districts of the Philippines
Politics of Isabela (province)
2018 establishments in the Philippines
Congressional districts of Cagayan Valley
Constituencies established in 2018